Aliabad-e Molla Ali (also Romanized as ‘Alīābād-e Mollā ‘Alī; also known as ‘Alīābād and ‘Alīāb-e Mollā ‘Alī) is a village in Borkhar-e Sharqi Rural District, Habibabad District, Borkhar County, Isfahan Province, Iran. At the 2006 census, its population was 2,702, in 676 families.

References 

Populated places in Borkhar County